The 1927 TCU Horned Frogs football team represented Texas Christian University (TCU) as a member the Southwest Conference (SWC) during the 1927 college football season. Led by fifth-year head coach Matty Bell, the Horned Frogs compiled and overall record of 4–3–2 overall with a mark of 1–2–2 in conference play, placing fifth. TCU played their home games at Clark Field, located on campus in Fort Worth, Texas.

Schedule

References

TCU
TCU Horned Frogs football seasons
TCU Horned Frogs football